Eugenie Besserer ( – May 29, 1934) was an American actress who starred in silent films and features of the early sound motion-picture era, beginning in 1910. Her most prominent role is that of the title character's mother in the first talkie film, The Jazz Singer.

Early life

Born in Marseilles, France, Besserer attended the Convent of Notre Dame in Ottawa, Ontario. She was taken by her parents to Ottawa as a girl, and spent her childhood there. She was left an orphan and escaped from her guardians at the age of 12. She came to New York City and arrived at Grand Central Station with only 25 cents (Canadian currency, equivalent to US$0.34 at the time) in her pocket. She managed to locate a former governess, with the assistance of a street car conductor, who helped Eugenie locate an uncle, with whom she lived. She continued her education there.

Career
Besserer's initial theatrical experience came with McKee Rankin when the producer had Nance O'Neill as a star. Soon, she appeared with notable stage actors including Frank Keenan and Wilton Lackaye. As a youth, she played a juvenile part with Maurice Barrymore. She performed a season at Pike's Opera House in Portland, Oregon. Another season, Besserer acted in a drama opposite Henry Kolker. The illness of her sister brought her to the West Coast, and she came to Hollywood in 1910 when films were just starting to be made.

In motion pictures, Eugenie was usually cast in mother roles, most famously as the mother of Al Jolson's character in The Jazz Singer. Eugenie became associated with the Selig Polyscope Company. A significant part for the actress was her role as Aunt Ray Innis in The Circular Staircase (1915), based on the novel by Mary Roberts Rinehart.

Personal life
When Besserer was 15, she married art dealer Albert W. Hegger. They had one daughter.

Death
On May 29, 1934, Besserer died at her Hollywood home, aged 64. A funeral mass was held at St. Theresa's Church, with a rosary service at Edwards Brothers Colonial Mortuary, Venice Boulevard, in Los Angeles. She is buried in Calvary Cemetery, East Los Angeles.

Selected filmography

1910s
 The Wonderful Wizard of Oz (1910, Short) as Aunt Em
 The Mother (1911, Short) as The Governor's Daughter
 The Still Alarm (1911, Short) as Elinor Fordham
 Stability vs. Nobility (1911, Short) as Bradley's 1st Daughter
 One of Nature's Noblemen (1911, Short) as Minnie Brown
 A Sacrifice to Civilization (1911, Short)
 The Craven Heart (1911, Short) as Madame Dantes
 It Happened in the West (1911, Short) as Prologue
 The Profligate (1911, Short) as Pauline Revere - the Wronged Wife
 Slick's Romance (1911, Short)
 Their Only Son (1911, Short)
 The Regeneration of Apache Kid (1911, Short) as Mrs. Dudley
 The Blacksmith's Love (1911, Short) as Mary Brewer Saunders
 Old Billy (1911, Short) as Mrs. Marming - the Widow
 The Bootlegger (1911, Short) as Mrs. Fancher
 An Evil Power (1911, Short) as Madame Celeste
 George Warrington's Escape (1911, Short) as Madame Esmond Warrington
 The Cowboy's Adopted Child (1912, Short) as Sarah Fowler
 The Other Fellow (1911, Short) as Mrs. Brown
 Bunkie (1912, Short) as Miss Ford - Brooks' Bethrothed
 Disillusioned (1912, Short) as Miss Gary
 The Danites (1912, Short) as The Widowed Schoolteacher
 As Told by Princess Bess (1912, Short) as Princess Bess (old)
 The Junior Officer (1912, Short) as Ethel Temple - the Count's Wife
 Me an' Bill (1912, Short) as Kitty Somners
 The End of the Romance (1912, Short) as Alice Gray
 The Hand of Fate (1912, Short) as Mrs. VanDuzen
 A Child of the Wilderness (1912, Short) as Tonoma - Joe's Protector
 In Exile (1912, Short) as Countess Romanoff
 The Lake of Dreams (1912, Short) as Madge Andrews
 His Masterpiece (1912, Short) as The Prima Donna
 The Little Indian Martyr (1912, Short) as Chiquito's Mother
 Sergeant Byrne of the Northwest Mounted Police (1912, Short) as Jessie Long
 The Indelible Stain (1912, Short) as Marla
 The Substitute Model (1912, Short) as Millicent Carr - the Substitute Model
 Monte Cristo (1912, Short) as Mercedes
 His Wedding Eve (1912, Short) as Mrs. Ellis - Tom's Mother
 Old Songs and Memories (1912, Short) as Nellie Laurence - the Old Lady
 The Vintage of Fate (1912, Short) as Minor Role (uncredited)
 Opitsah: Apache for Sweetheart (1912, Short) as Mrs. McGuire - Jim's Mother
 The Millionaire Vagabonds (1912, Short) as Mrs. Knobhill
 Sammy Orpheus; or, The Pied Piper of the Jungle (1912, Short) as Kate
 The Last of Her Tribe (1912, Short) as Neepah - Moquin's Squaw
 The Governor's Daughter (1913, Short) as Mrs. Carey - Jim's Mother
 The Spanish Parrot Girl (1913, Short) as Mrs. Avery
 Diverging Paths (1913, Short) as Lily and Rose's Mother
 Love Before Ten (1913, Short) as Mrs. Walters
 Dollar Down, Dollar a Week (1913, Short) as Mrs. Sanger - the Aunt
 In the Days of Witchcraft (1913, Short) as Lady Beresford
 Lieutenant Jones (1913, Short) as Mrs. Cartright
 Indian Summer (1913, Short) as Virginia
 Wamba A Child of the Jungle (1913, Short) as Mrs. Rice
 The Girl and the Judge (1913, Short) as Mrs. Goff - the Judge's Wife
 A Flag of Two Wars (1913, Short) as Mrs. John Reed
 Woman: Past and Present (1913, Short) as Grandmother America
 The Fighting Lieutenant (1913, Short) as The Countess
 In God We Trust (1913, Short) as Bill's Wife
 The Ne'er to Return Road (1913, Short) as Mrs. Hansen - Chris' Mother
 The Unseen Defense (1913, Short) as Minerva Wingood
 The Acid Test (1913, Short) as Mrs. Argonet
 Fate Fashions a Letter (1913, Short) as Mrs. Rand
 The Probationer (1913, Short) as Granny
 Phantoms (1913, Short) as Natalie Storm
 The Master of the Garden (1913, Short) as Mrs. Harrington - Bessie's Mother
 Memories (1914) as Mary, Professor Scott's sweetheart
 Elizabeth's Prayer (1914, Short) as Hilda Crosby, an unscrupulous actress
 The Salvation of Nance O'Shaughnessy (1914, Short) as Mame Ryan
 The Fire Jugglers (1914, Short) as Mrs. Leavitt
 Me an' Bill (1914, Short) as Kitty
 His Fight (1914, Short) as Mrs. Brant
 The Man in Black (1914, Short)
 Ye Vengeful Vagabonds (1914, Short) as Betsy Spratt - Peggy's Mother
 Hearts and Masks (1914, Short) as Mrs. Hyphen-Bonds
 The Tragedy That Lived (1914, Short) as Mary's Grandmother
 The Story of the Blood Red Rose (1914, Short) as Queen of Urania
 The Vision of the Shepherd (1915, Short) as Maggie Hunt
 Poetic Justice of Omar Khan (1915, Short) as Neva Hyde
 The Carpet from Bagdad (1915) as Mrs. Chedsoye
 Ingratitude of Liz Taylor (1915, Short)
 The Rosary (1915) as Widow Kelly
 The Circular Staircase (1915) as Aunt Ray
 The Bridge of Time (1915, Short)
 Just as I Am (1915, Short)
 I'm Glad My Boy Grew Up to Be a Soldier (1915) as Mrs. Warrington
 The Devil-in-Chief (1916, Short) as Johann's Mistress
 Thou Shalt Not Covet (1916) as my wife
 The Grinning Skull (1916, Short) as Mme. Ward Howe
 A Social Deception (1916, Short) as Grace Elliott
 The Woman Who Did Not Care (1916, Short) as Mrs. Boyd
 The Temptation of Adam (1916, Short) as Dorothy Blaine
 The Crisis (1916) as Mrs. Brice
 Twisted Trails (1916, Short) as Martha, the housekeeper
 The Garden of Allah (1916) as Lady Rens
 Beware of Strangers (1917) as Mary DeLacy
 Little Lost Sister (1917) as Mrs. Welcome
 Her Salvation (1917, Short) as Mame Ryan
 The Witness for the State (1917, Short)
 The Curse of Eve (1917) as the Mother
 Who Shall Take My Life? (1917) as Mrs. Munroe
 In After Years (1917, Short)
 The City of Purple Dreams (1918)
 The Still Alarm (1918) as Minor Role
 A Hoosier Romance (1918) as the squire's wife
 The Eyes of Julia Deep (1918) as Mrs. Lowe
 The Road Through the Dark (1918) as Aunt Julie
 The Sea Flower (1918) as Kealani
 Little Orphant Annie (1918) as Mrs. Goode
 Ravished Armenia (1919)
 Turning the Tables (1919) as Mrs. Feverill
 Scarlet Days (1919) as Rosie Nell
 The Greatest Question (1919) as Mrs. Hilton

1920s
 The Fighting Shepherdess (1920) as Jezebel
 The Gift Supreme (1920) as Martha Vinton
 For the Soul of Rafael (1920) as Dona Luisa
 The Brand of Lopez (1920) as Señora Castillo
 Fickle Women (1920) as Mrs. Price
 Seeds of Vengeance (1920) as Judith Cree
 45 Minutes from Broadway (1920) as Mrs. David Dean
 The Scoffer (1920) as Boorman's wife
 What Happened to Rosa (1920) as Madame O'Donnelly
 The Breaking Point (1921) as Mrs. Janeway
 Good Women (1921) as Mrs. Emmeline Shelby
 The Sin of Martha Queed (1921) as Alicia Queed
 The Light in the Clearing (1921) as Roving Kate
 Molly O' (1921) as Antonia Bacigalupi
 The Rosary (1922) as Widow Kathleen Wilson
 Penrod (1922)
 Kindred of the Dust (1922) as Mrs. McKaye
 The Hands of Nara (1922) as Mrs. Claveloux
 June Madness (1922) as Mrs. Whitmore
 The Strangers' Banquet (1922) as Mrs. McPherson
 The Lonely Road (1923) as Martha True
 Her Reputation (1923) as Madame Cervanez
 The Rendezvous (1923) as Nini
 Anna Christie (1923) as Marthy
 Enemies of Children (1923) as Mrs. Slavin
 Bread (1924) as Mrs. Sturgis
 The Price She Paid (1924) as Mrs. Elton Gower
 A Fool and His Money (1925) as Mother
 Friendly Enemies (1925) as Marie 
 Confessions of a Queen (1925) as Elanora
 The Coast of Folly (1925) as nanny
 The Circle (1925) as Lady Catherine "Kitty" Cheney
 Wandering Footsteps (1925) as Elizabeth Stuyvesant Whitney
 Bright Lights (1925) as Patsy's mother
 The Skyrocket (1926) as wardrobe mistress
 Kiki (1926) as landlady (uncredited)
 Winning the Futurity (1926) as Mary Allen
 The Millionaire Policeman (1926) as Mrs. Gray
 The Fire Brigade (1926) as Mrs. O'Neil
 Flesh and the Devil (1926) as Leo's mother
 Wandering Girls (1927) as Peggy's mother
 The Night of Love (1927) as gypsy (uncredited)
 When a Man Loves (1927) as the landlady (uncredited)
 Captain Salvation (1927) as Mrs. Buxom
 Slightly Used (1927) as Aunt Lydia
 The Jazz Singer (1927) as Sara Rabinowitz
 Drums of Love (1928) as Duchess de Alvia
 Two Lovers (1928) as Madame Van Rycke
 Yellow Lily (1928) as Archduchess
 Lilac Time (1928) as Madame Berthelot
 A Lady of Chance (1928) as Mrs. 'Ma' Crandall
 The Bridge of San Luis Rey (1929) as a nun
 Thunderbolt (1929) as Mrs. Morgan
 Madame X (1929) as Rose, Floriot's servant
 Whispering Winds (1929) as Jim's mother
 Speedway (1929) as Mrs. MacDonald
 Fast Company (1929) as Mrs. Kane
 Illusion  (1929) as Mrs. Jacob Schmittlap
 Mister Antonio (1929) as Mrs. Jorny 
 Seven Faces (1929) as Madame Vallon

1930s
 A Royal Romance (1930) as Mother
 In Gay Madrid (1930) as Doña Generosa (as Eugenia Besserer)
 Du Barry, Woman of Passion (1930) as Rosalie / prison matron (uncredited)
 Scarface (1932) as citizens committee member (uncredited)
 Six Hours to Live (1932) as The Marquisa (uncredited)
 To the Last Man (1933) as Granny Spelvin (final film role)

References

The Los Angeles Times, "Eugenie Besserer Dead", May 31, 1934, p. A2
The Monessen, Pennsylvania Daily Independent, "Miss Eugenie Besserer Arrived In New York City With Just 25 Cents-Now A Star In Pictures", September 16, 1915, p. 3

External links

19th-century births
1934 deaths
Year of birth uncertain
American film actresses
American people of French descent
American people of Canadian descent
American silent film actresses
American stage actresses
20th-century American actresses
Burials at Calvary Cemetery (Los Angeles)
Actresses from New York (state)